is a professional Japanese baseball player. He plays pitcher for the Hokkaido Nippon-Ham Fighters.

References

External links

 Career statistics - NPB.jp
 17 伊藤 大海 選手名鑑2021 - Hokkaido Nippon-Ham Fighters Official site 

1997 births
Living people
Baseball people from Hokkaido
Nippon Professional Baseball pitchers
Hokkaido Nippon-Ham Fighters  players
Olympic baseball players of Japan
Baseball players at the 2020 Summer Olympics
Olympic medalists in baseball
Olympic gold medalists for Japan
Medalists at the 2020 Summer Olympics
2023 World Baseball Classic players